Bokeem Woodbine (born April 13, 1973) is an American actor. In 1994, he portrayed Joshua, Jason's troubled brother, in Jason's Lyric. He won a Black Reel Award, and was nominated for a Primetime Emmy Award and a Critics' Choice Television Award for his role as Kansas City enforcer Mike Milligan in the second season of Fargo. Woodbine also portrayed Daniel in season 2 of the WGN series Underground and Herman Schultz/Shocker in the film Spider-Man: Homecoming.

Early life and education
Woodbine was born on April 13, 1973, in Harlem, New York. He attended the Dalton School on Manhattan's Upper East Side, before transferring to the Fiorello H. LaGuardia High School of Music & Art and Performing Arts in the city. He is a lifelong martial arts practitioner having studied Hapkido and Shaolin Kung-Fu.

Career
With the encouragement of his actress mother, Woodbine entered show business at age 19 as a stand-in and extra in Ernest Dickerson's directorial debut, Juice (1992), starring Tupac Shakur and Omar Epps. In the following year, he made his TV acting debut in the CBS Schoolbreak Special entitled "Love Off Limits". His appearance was noticed by casting director Jaki Brown-Karman, who later recommended him to Forest Whitaker for the latter's directorial effort, the HBO television movie Strapped (1993). Since then, he has worked with other major African-American filmmakers such as Spike Lee, Mario Van Peebles and the Hughes Brothers in the films Crooklyn (1994), Panther (1995) and Dead Presidents (1995), respectively.

In 1996, he appeared in Shakur's music video for "I Ain't Mad at Cha" and formed a friendship with the rapper. They subsequently reunited in Vondie Curtis-Hall's directorial debut, Gridlock'd, which was released four months after Shakur's death. In 1999, Woodbine appeared in an episode of HBO's The Sopranos as New Jersey Gangster rapper Massive Genius.

Woodbine was featured as a regular on the NBC midseason sitcom Battery Park and played Dr. Damon Bradley, who later turned out to be a serial rapist, in the short-lived CBS medical drama City of Angels, the latter of which earned him a nomination for the NAACP Image Award for Outstanding Supporting Actor in a Drama Series. Additionally, he appeared in the Wu-Tang Clan's music videos for their songs "Protect Ya Neck II (The Jump Off)", "Gravel Pit", and "Careful (Click, Click)". Woodbine went to portray saxophonist David "Fathead" Newman in the Oscar-winning Ray Charles biopic Ray.

Over the next few years, Woodbine made minor appearances in both film and television. On the small screen, he could be seen in an episode of Fox's crime drama Bones and ABC's short-lived cop drama The Evidence, as well as two episodes of Spike TV's Blade: The Series, based on Marvel Comics' character and popular film series. The next year, Woodbine appeared with his Blade: The Series co-star Sticky Fingaz in his musical drama film A Day in the Life, starring Omar Epps and Mekhi Phifer, and two films by Jesse V. Johnson: the low-budget sci-fi/action movie The Last Sentinel (alongside Don "The Dragon" Wilson and Katee Sackhoff), and the action film The Butcher, opposite Eric Roberts. He also became a series regular, as Leon Cooley, an inmate on death row, in the TNT crime/drama series Saving Grace alongside Holly Hunter.

In 2009, Woodbine appeared in the blaxploitation film Black Dynamite and followed it up the next year with the M. Night Shyamalan-produced supernatural thriller Devil. He has also appeared as a police officer on the critically acclaimed series Southland (2011). He next appeared in the 2012 remake of Total Recall and then Riddick the next year.

In December 2015, he received a Critics' Choice Television Award nomination for Best Supporting Actor in a Movie/Miniseries and a Primetime Emmy Award nomination for his role as Mike Milligan in Fargo.

In 2017, Woodbine appeared in the Sony Pictures and Marvel Studios film Spider-Man: Homecoming, as Shocker, one of four villains, alongside Michael Keaton, Logan Marshall-Green and Michael Chernus. In 2018, Woodbine starred in the series Unsolved. He played Daryn Dupree, who was part of a police task force that investigated the murders of rappers Notorious BIG and Tupac Shakur. In 2021, Woodbine played Sheriff Domingo in Ghostbusters: Afterlife.

Filmography

Film

Television

Video games

Awards and nominations

References

External links

1973 births
Living people
Male actors from New York City
American male film actors
American male television actors
American male voice actors
People from Harlem
20th-century American male actors
21st-century American male actors
African-American male actors
Dalton School alumni
Fiorello H. LaGuardia High School alumni
20th-century African-American people
21st-century African-American people